Robert Malcolm (born 12 November 1980 in Glasgow) is a Scottish former football player and coach.

Malcolm played as a centre-back or defensive midfielder for Rangers, Derby County, Queens Park Rangers (on loan), Motherwell, Brisbane Roar, Dundee and Cowdenbeath. He also represented Scotland in under-21 and 'B' team international matches.

Since retiring as a player, Malcolm has worked as a coach.  He assisted Barry Ferguson during his time as manager of Blackpool and Clyde.

Playing career

Rangers
He began his career playing for Scottish Premier League team Rangers, either as a centre back or a defensive midfielder. A graduate of the club's youth system, Malcolm played 115 games (three goals) in all competitions across his seven years as a senior player at Rangers, winning four major honours (two league titles, a Scottish Cup and a Scottish League Cup).

In May 2004, Malcolm was fined £5,000 after signing "FTP" (an acronym depicting "Fuck The Pope") alongside an autograph for a fan. Anti-sectarian charity Nil by Mouth made Rangers aware of the incident which took place at a private club function. In November 2004, Malcolm was sent-off from the dug-out at Ibrox Stadium and escorted to the dressing room by two police officers for making what was reported to have been obscene gestures towards fans of rival Scottish club Celtic, during an Old Firm derby. However, he did return to the bench later in the match.

Despite playing 17 times for Rangers during season 2005–06 under Alex McLeish, he was not in the plans of new manager Paul Le Guen for the new season and was left out of the squad's pre-season trip to South Africa. He had been linked with moves to Dundee United, Ipswich Town, Coventry City, Wolverhampton Wanderers, Preston North End and Millwall before being released by Rangers on 31 August 2006.

Derby County
Malcolm signed for Derby County on 6 September. He played a part in The Rams promotion to the English Premier League, but injuries hampered his progress at the Derby and on 16 November 2007 he joined Championship club Queens Park Rangers on loan until 1 January 2008, where he joined up with ex-Derby teammates Lee Camp and Adam Bolder.

On 28 December 2007, Malcolm was suspended by Derby County after he was charged by police with a drink driving offence, although he was playing for QPR at the time. The charge related to an alleged incident on the M1 motorway in Derbyshire the previous morning. He was bailed to appear before Chesterfield Magistrates Court on 16 January 2008. During this hearing the case was adjourned until 29 January. After the adjournment Malcolm admitted to being unfit to drive through drink and he was subsequently banned from driving. On 31 January 2008 Malcolm had his Derby County contract paid up by manager Paul Jewell, after playing only 14 games for The Rams, with one Premier League appearance in a 6–0 defeat at Liverpool.

Motherwell
Reports in February 2008 had linked him with a move to FC Dallas, but, after failing a fitness test, he instead opted to join Scottish Premier League side Motherwell on 26 February 2008, signing a contract until the end of the 2007–08 season. Malcolm then signed a further one-year deal with the club on 10 July 2008.

Brisbane Roar
Malcolm signed for Queensland-based A-League team Brisbane Roar in July 2009 where former Rangers teammates Craig Moore and Charlie Miller played at the time. He was released by the Roar after the team started a rebuilding phase under new coach Ange Postecoglou.

Dundee
In March 2010, Malcolm moved back to Scotland, with First Division hopefuls Dundee. Having made three appearances for Dundee he was released by the club on 4 May 2010, along with 8 other players.

Cowdenbeath
Malcolm signed for Cowdenbeath in March 2011.  He was released in May 2011 following Cowdenbeath's relegation to the Second Division. After missing a year through injury, Malcolm trained with East Fife in July 2012. However, ultimately he never played for another senior club.

International
Malcolm made appearances for both Scotland U21 and Scotland B. He was also called up to the senior Scotland team in February 2003 but was ultimately never capped at that level.

Coaching career
Malcolm was appointed to a coaching position at Blackpool in January 2014, working for his former Rangers teammate Barry Ferguson. In a match against Burnley in April 2014, Malcolm was filmed pushing Blackpool player Stephen Dobbie in the face. Ferguson subsequently admitted that tensions were a "bit high". Blackpool avoided relegation from the Football League Championship, but Ferguson and Malcolm left the club at the end of the 2013–14 season.

Ferguson was appointed manager of Scottish League Two club Clyde and in June 2014 recruited Malcolm to be a coach. Malcolm was promoted to the position of assistant manager at Clyde in August 2014. After Ferguson resigned on 26 February, Malcolm took caretaker charge of one match.

In October 2017, Malcolm was seen operating an ice cream van in Glasgow's Barlanark neighbourhood, filling in for a relative who owned the operation.

Malcolm was the assistant manager of Kelty Hearts, working under Barry Ferguson, up until 2021, when Ferguson was appointed as manager of Alloa Athletic.

Statistics

Playing statistics

Managerial statistics

Honours

Rangers
Scottish Premier League: 2002–03, 2004–05
 Scottish Cup: 2002–03
 Scottish League Cup: 2004–05

References

External links

1980 births
Living people
Footballers from Glasgow
Scottish footballers
Association football central defenders
Association football midfielders
Scotland under-21 international footballers
Scotland B international footballers
Scottish Premier League players
Rangers F.C. players
Scottish expatriate footballers
Premier League players
Derby County F.C. players
English Football League players
Queens Park Rangers F.C. players
Motherwell F.C. players
Expatriate soccer players in Australia
A-League Men players
Brisbane Roar FC players
Scottish expatriate sportspeople in Australia
Dundee F.C. players
Cowdenbeath F.C. players
East Fife F.C. players
Blackpool F.C. non-playing staff
Wrexham A.F.C. players
Clyde F.C. non-playing staff
Clyde F.C. managers
Scottish football managers
Association football coaches